Elmonte, also known as Twilford, is a historic home located at Ellicott City, Howard County, Maryland, United States. It is a -story country house, built of random ashlar granite in the Italian villa style, and is thought to have been completed in 1858.  To the rear of the mansion is a stuccoed carriage house with a two-car garage. East of the house is a large wooden barn with a slate roof and a log smokehouse. The home was built by a member of the Dorsey family, who also built nearby Dorsey Hall.

Elmonte was listed on the National Register of Historic Places in 1978.

See also
List of Howard County properties in the Maryland Historical Trust

References

External links
, including photo from 2001, at Maryland Historical Trust

Houses on the National Register of Historic Places in Maryland
Howard County, Maryland landmarks
Houses in Howard County, Maryland
Buildings and structures in Ellicott City, Maryland
Houses completed in 1858
National Register of Historic Places in Howard County, Maryland